Illegal Tender is the first EP by the alternative rock group Louis XIV. It was released on January 21, 2005, and features the band's first single, "Finding Out True Love Is Blind," which was also included on the band's first album, The Best Little Secrets Are Kept, released later in 2005.

Track listing
 "Louis XIV" (Hill/Karcig) – 2:42
 "Finding Out True Love Is Blind" (Hill/Karcig) – 4:13
 "Illegal Tender" (Hill/Karcig/Maigaard) – 3:14
 "Marc" (Hill/Karcig) – 3:40
 "Louis Reprise" (Hill/Karcig) – 5:01

Personnel (incomplete)
 Jason Hill - guitar, vocals
 Brian Karcig - guitar, vocals
 Jimmy Armburst - bass
 Mark Maigaard - drums

In other media
The song was featured in "Hot Dogs", an episode of the television series Veronica Mars.

References

Louis XIV (band) albums
2005 EPs